The .500 Wyoming Express or .500 WE is a "big bore" handgun cartridge. It was introduced in 2005 by Freedom Arms for their Model 83 .500 WE revolver.

Like most handgun cartridges of this size, it is used almost exclusively in revolvers. It is designed mainly for hunting rather than self-defense or tactical usage.

Overview
The cartridge is comparable in size to the .50 Action Express but has higher powder loads and normally a lower velocity.  Though not as powerful as the .500 S&W Magnum, the .500 Wyoming Express is one of the most powerful handgun cartridges commercially available today and is capable of taking  any large game animal. Other similar cartridges are the .500 Linebaugh, and the .50 Beowulf.

See also
List of handgun cartridges
12 mm caliber

References

External links
Freedom Arms website
.500 WE page at Freedom Arms website

Pistol and rifle cartridges
Magnum pistol cartridges